Lord of the Fries is an Australian and New Zealand casual dining fast food chain, originally based in Melbourne, before expanding into other regions. It serves only vegan dishes including loaded french fries, veggie burgers, hot dogs and a number of various sides and breakfast items. Lord of the Fries first started as a vegetarian "mobile chip van" in August 2004 which was driven across the country until late 2005 when the first store location was opened in Melbourne's city centre. Due to the menu consisting entirely of plant-based products, all meals from the chain are Kosher and Halal. The vegetarian food brand became 100% vegan in 2011. The founders are vegan as are most of the franchisees.  

In 2018, the company announced a partnership with U.S. producer Beyond Meat, with financial backing from actor Leonardo DiCaprio and the former CEO of McDonald's, making them the first Australian restaurant chain to offer their plant-based burger patties.

Expansion 
After opening the first permanent store in Melbourne, founders Mark and Amanda + Mark’s brother Sam Koronczyk have expanded the chain across Australia, with a restaurant in almost every state; one in New South Wales and Western Australia two in Queensland and South Australia, and fourteen in Victoria. The company also plans to further open seven new stores a year over a six-year period. Lord of the Fries opened their first international store in Auckland, New Zealand in 2016. The company has some minor brands stemming from their LOTF stores. Recently they have launched their side brand “Lord of the…” with plant based take home macaroni and cheese products.

Locations 
Lord of the Fries has nineteen Australian and four New Zealand locations.

References

External links
Australian 
New Zealand 

Fast-food chains of Australia
Restaurants established in 2004
2004 establishments in Australia
Vegetarian restaurants in Australia